Daniel Paul Lewis (born 18 June 1982) is an English footballer who plays as a goalkeeper for Brackley Town.

Career
Born in Redditch, Worcestershire, Lewis played for the youth team of Alvechurch and went on to play for Bromsgrove Sunday team Garringtons, where he conceded 40 goals in 37 games. He left in 2002 for Studley and forced his way into the team, but had a trial at Kidderminster Harriers and joined them in May 2004. His Football League debut came in a 3–0 defeat to Northampton Town on 7 May 2005. He went on to make 15 appearances in the Conference National the following season, after which he joined Moor Green in the Conference North. After one season with Moor Green, he joined hometown club Redditch United in July 2007.

He re-signed for Kidderminster on a one-year contract on 10 May 2010. On 28 April 2015, it was announced that Lewis would be released to pursue a career outside full-time football.

On 5 May 2015, Lewis signed for National League North side Solihull Moors.

Ahead of the 2017–18 season, Lewis joined Brackley Town. In his first season with the club, Brackley won the FA Trophy, beating Bromley 5–4 on penalties in the final. In 2022, after finishing second in the league, Lewis was named in the National League North 2021–22 Team of the Season.

Honours
Brackley Town
FA Trophy: 2017–18

Individual
National League North Team of the Year: 2021–22

References

External links

1982 births
Living people
Sportspeople from Redditch
English footballers
Association football goalkeepers
Alvechurch F.C. players
Studley F.C. players
Moor Green F.C. players
Redditch United F.C. players
Kidderminster Harriers F.C. players
Solihull Moors F.C. players
Brackley Town F.C. players
English Football League players
National League (English football) players